Brazil's Next Top Model (often abbreviated as BrNTM) was a  Brazilian  reality television series based on Tyra Banks' America's Next Top Model. The series began airing in October 2007 on Sony Entertainment Television. It was produced by the Brazilian branch of Sony Entertainment Television in association with  Moonshot Pictures. The series enjoyed three seasons until its cancellation in 2009.

History
In early 2007, Sony Entertainment Television announced plans that for a Brazilian adaptation of the reality TV series created and produced by Tyra Banks in the United States.

One of the production decisions leading up to the show that caught the most media attention was the selection of the Brazilian model who would play the role belonging to Banks in the original adaptation. The channel's first choice was originally Brazilian model Gisele Bündchen, though the network later settled on Fernanda Motta for the position.

The application process for the show's first season took place during July 2007. Filming for the inaugural season began on 19 August, and the show  premiered on 3 October of the same year.

The panel of judges for the first season consisted of Motta, journalist Erika Palomino, photographer Paulo Borges, and designer Alexandre Herchcovitch. The show's first winner, 19 year-old Mariana Velho from Santos, was crowned on 17 December 2007.

Work for a fourth season did not continue after 2009. RecordTV later re-branded the show under a new title, Top Model, o Reality, in 2012, though the new adaptation was only loosely based on the original Top Model format. The new show ceased production after the airing of its first season.

Format
The show followed the format of the original adaptation very closely, though producers of the show stated that the general approach to the candidates would involve "less cruelty" in comparison to the example set by Banks. Episodes were divided into segments that more or less consisted of a fashion lesson, followed by a challenge and photo shoot, and ending in the elimination of a contestant at the end of each week. Each season began with a pool of about 20 semi-finalists, from which 13 finalists would be chosen at the end of the first episode. With the exception of the series' second season, the show did not schedule visits to an international destination, opting to visit local destinations in the country instead.

Judges

Cycles

External links
 Official website

References

Brazil's Next Top Model
2007 Brazilian television series debuts
2009 Brazilian television series endings
Brazilian reality television series
Portuguese-language television shows
Brazilian television series based on American television series